Jonathan  Wilkes (born 1 August 1978) is an English television presenter and singer.

Early life and career 
Jonathan Wilkes was born in Baddeley Green, Stoke-on-Trent, to Eileen Wilkes and Graham Wilkes, and spent most of his childhood in Packmoor, an outlying village of Chell, with his friend Robbie Williams. He has one older sister called Kay. He signed for Port Vale FC, aged seven, and played for Everton FC as a teenager. He was dropped from the team due to his unwillingness to 'eat, sleep and breathe football'.

His first stage role was in a Stoke Amateur Operatic Society production of Hans Christian Andersen, playing opposite his friend Robbie Williams.

In 1996, he won the Cameron Mackintosh Young Entertainer of the Year Award. From this, he went on to work in Blackpool under the name 'Jonathan and the Space Girls', until being spotted by Kevin Bishop of the BBC, who employed him as a presenter for the precursor channel to BBC3. He has since gone on to work in West End Musicals, and has presented You've Been Framed!. 

After signing a record deal with Virgin, Wilkes had a brief spell as a pop-music singer like his friend Robbie Williams, his single "Just Another Day" went to No. 24 in the UK Singles Chart. The single hit the Top 5 in 18 countries worldwide. During his brief singing career, he performed with his friend Robbie Williams at the Royal Albert Hall and sang Somethin' Stupid together which received positive reviews. However, Wilkes later opted to stop making music in order to move back into TV and stage work, the latter being his biggest passion.

Wilkes is a panto star, being a regular at the Regent Theatre Stoke since 2005.

Soccer Aid 
Wilkes participates and assists in the organisation of Soccer Aid, an event he has been involved in since 2006 with his friend Robbie Williams.

Personal life
Wilkes attended City of Stoke-on-Trent Sixth Form College. He is a boyhood fan of Port Vale like his friend Robbie Williams.

While working for the BBC, he lived in London with his friend Robbie Williams in Williams' mansion. Also while at the BBC, he met his wife Nikki. The couple live in Royal Wootton Bassett.

In September 2013, Wilkes opened his own full-time performing arts college called Wilkes Academy. The patrons of the academy include Ant and Dec, Arlene Phillips and his friend Robbie Williams. The college is based in Swindon.

Discography

Single

References

External links 
 

English male musical theatre actors
English male singers
English male stage actors
English television presenters
People from Baddeley Green
1978 births
Living people
English footballers
Association footballers not categorized by position